His Highness Mohammad Sabah Al-Salem Al-Sabah (born 10 October 1955) is the former Deputy Prime Minister of Kuwait.

Early life and education
Al-Sabah was born on 10 October 1955 and is a son of the former Emir of Kuwait, Sheikh Sabah III Al-Salim Al-Sabah and Nouriya Al-Ahmad Al-Sabah, sister of the current Emir. His elder brother is Salem Sabah Al-Salem Al-Sabah, former defense and interior minister. Mohammed Sabah Al Sabah received a bachelor's degree in economics from Claremont McKenna College. In addition, he earned a master's degree and a PhD in economics and Middle Eastern studies from Harvard University.

Career

Government service 
In 1993, he was appointed ambassador of Kuwait to the United States. He remained in this position until 14 February 2001 when he was appointed state minister for foreign affairs. He was the minister of Finance from January 2003 to July 2003. On 11 February 2006, Mohammad was appointed deputy prime minister while retaining the position of minister of foreign affairs.

He resigned from office on 18 October 2011 in protest of alleged corruption in Kuwait's government. After leaving office, Al-Sabah began to work as a visiting fellow at Oxford University.

Personal life
Al-Sabah is married to Feryal Duaij Al Salman Al Sabah and has four children.

Councils, committees and memberships

Kuwait 
 Chairman of the board of directors of the Kuwait Fund for Arab Economic Development (2003–2011)
 Member of the Supreme Council of the Environment Public Authority (2003–2011)
 Member of the National Security Council (2003–2011)
 Member of the Supreme Council for Planning and Development (2006–2011)
 Member of the Kuwait National Nuclear Energy Committee (2009–2011)
 Acting Chairman of the Civil Service Commission (2003–2011)

Honours and awards 
 2014 Robert and JoAnn Bendetson Global Leadership Award in Public Diplomacy from Fletcher School at Tufts University
 1978 Recipient of The Salvatori Scholar Prize

References

External links

1955 births
Living people
Mohammad Sabah Al Salem
Harvard University alumni
Academic staff of Kuwait University
Kuwaiti diplomats
Ambassadors of Kuwait to the United States
Finance ministers of Kuwait
Foreign ministers of Kuwait
Academics of the University of Oxford
Prime Ministers of Kuwait
Sons of monarchs